The Australian Labor Party Caucus comprises all the elected members of the Australian Labor Party (ALP) in both Houses of the national Parliament. The Caucus determines some matters of policy, parliamentary tactics, and disciplinary measures against disobedient MPs. It is alternatively known as the Federal Parliamentary Labor Party (FPLP).

The Caucus is also involved in the election of the federal parliamentary leaders from among its members, as well as his or her dismissal. The leader has historically been a member of the House of Representatives, but though by convention a prime minister is the person who has the support of a majority in the House of Representatives, in the ALP all members (including senators) have an equal vote in the election of the leader, who may then become prime minister. Since October 2013, a ballot of both the Caucus and by the Labor Party's rank-and-file members has determined the party leader and the deputy leader. Bill Shorten was the first leader elected under the new system in late 2013. In government, the federal Caucus also chooses the Ministers, with the portfolios then allocated by the Labor Prime Minister. 

The word "Caucus" has American roots and was introduced to the ALP by King O'Malley, an American-born Labor member of the first federal Parliament in 1901. In the non-Labor parties, such party meetings are more commonly described as a "party room".

Party factions
The Caucus is divided along formal factional lines, with most voting taking place on a bloc factional basis, especially in the case of appointments, and may involve cross-factional deals. The two biggest factions are the National Right and the National Left. Each of these factions contains smaller state-based factions, such as (on the Right) the Victorian Labor Unity group and (on the Left) the Victorian Socialist Left. Members who are not associated with either faction are described as Independents. The two main factions hold factional meetings once a week during Parliamentary sitting weeks.

Factional discipline has declined considerably in recent years. During the leadership contest between Kim Beazley and Mark Latham in December 2003, for example, members of both Left and Right were found in the camps of both candidates. Some of the most hostile relations in the Caucus are between members of the same faction: the relationship between Beazley and Simon Crean is one example.

Factional allegiances in the Caucus tend to be closely related to state political loyalties, and also to trade union affiliations. Large unions such as the Australian Workers' Union, the Australian Manufacturing Workers Union and the Shop, Distributive and Allied Employees Association, regard as "theirs" Members and Senators who formerly held office in those unions, or who have received union support in gaining their preselections, and expect them to act in the union's interests.

Structure

See also
Faceless men

References

Bibliography
 "Who's Who in the Factional Zoo," a table appearing on page 415-416 of The Latham Diaries by Mark Latham.

Caucus
Political terminology in Australia